The Ama Museum is a museum dedicated to comfort women in Taiwan. It opened in 2016, in Datong District, Taipei. The original location closed in November 2020, and the museum is scheduled to relocate and reopen in April 2021.

Name
The museum is dedicated to those who were comfort women during the Japanese rule of Taiwan. Ama means grandmother in Taiwanese Hokkien, referring to the advanced age of those who had survived World War II.

History
The original idea to establish the museum started in 2004. Supported by a large donation from the public in and outside Taiwan, as well as the Taipei Women's Rescue Foundation (TWRF), the museum plaque was unveiled in a ceremony on 8 March 2016 in conjunction with International Women's Day. The ceremony was attended by President Ma Ying-jeou and one former comfort woman.

The museum was finally opened on 10 December 2016 in a ceremony attended by Culture Minister Cheng Li-chun in conjunction with Human Rights Day and the 25th anniversary of the efforts made by the foundation towards comfort women. Speaking during the ceremony, Cheng urged people to never forget the past and to strive for better gender equality. The TWRF chair said that the museum would also be a place to promote gender equality and highlight the damages made by sexual abuse. The ceremony was also attended by one surviving Taiwanese comfort woman and advocates from Japan, South Korea and the United States.

The Taipei Women's Rescue Foundation announced in July 2020 that the Ama Museum would close in November 2020. The museum had operated at a loss since it opened in 2016, and the TWRF sold its offices in 2019 in an effort to keep the museum running. However, the COVID-19 pandemic reduced the museum's income further, leading to the decision to close it. In October 2020, the Taipei Women's Rescue Foundation began a fundraiser to move the Ama Museum, confirming that the original location would close on 10 November 2020. On 7 November 2020, the Taipei Women's Rescue Foundation released another statement on the fate of the Ama Museum, stating that its exhibits would move to an office building near Minquan West Road metro station, scheduled to open in April 2021.

Architecture
The museum was originally housed in a renovated 90-year-old 2-story building with a total floor area of 495 m2. The original location featured a café and workshop space.

Exhibitions
At its original location, the museum permanently displayed photos, documents and videos related to Taiwanese comfort women. When it reopened, the museum planned to rotate exhibitions and introduce new ones.

Activities
In its original location, the museum hosted various workshops and seminars on topics related to human rights. In August 2017, the museum launched a campaign to pressure the Government of Japan through the Japan–Taiwan Exchange Association to apologize and compensate the remaining comfort women.

Transportation
The museum's original location was accessible within walking distance south west of Daqiaotou Station of Taipei Metro. Its new location will be an office building near Minquan West Road Station.

See also
 List of museums in Taiwan

References

External links

 

2016 establishments in Taiwan
Biographical museums in Taiwan
Museums established in 2016
Museums in Taipei
Human rights museums
Women's museums
+